The United States Air Force's 119th Command and Control Squadron (119 CACS) is a space control unit located at McGhee Tyson ANGB, Tennessee. The unit augments the operations of USSTRATCOM on a continuous basis.

Mission
The 119th Command and Control Squadron was one of the first Air National Guard units to become a part of the United States Space Command (later United States Strategic Command). Its mission is augmentation for USSTRATCOM's global operations center (GOC) which coordinates and directs the use of the Department of Defense’s military space forces.

The 119 CACS provides support to Headquarters USSTRATCOM via three primary Command and Control mission areas: Global Operations, Homeland Defense Operations, and Natural Disaster Events.

History
The 119 CACS was originally activated as 119th Aircraft Warning and Control Squadron in 1950. Since its inception, the 119 ACS had always operated tactical (mobile) radar systems, but was slated to lose its mission and association with Air Combat Command. This provided a fortuitous opportunity for the unit to be associated with USSPACECOM as a direct supporting unit. In the mid-1990s, USSPACECOM commander Gen Howard Estes III directed the command to expand the role of guard and reserve forces in operations from two percent to 20 percent.

Previous designations
119th Command and Control Squadron (16 August 2002 – present)
119th Air Control Squadron on (16 June 1992 – 16 August 2002)
119th Tactical Control Squadron (1 September 1965 – 16 June 1992)
119th Aircraft Warning & Control Flight (1 December 1953 – 1 September 1965)
119th Aircraft Warning & Control Squadron (21 March 1949 – 1 December 1953)

Commanders
Col Vince Franklin (2012 – present) 
Lt Col David Evans (2008–2012)
Lt Col Luttrell Gus Schettler (2003–2008)
Lt Col John F. White (1995–2003)
Lt Col Clyde Huskey(??-??)
Lt Col Nick Hanson(1987–1993)
Lt Col Fred Bonney (1974–1987)
Lt Col James W. Manley (1972–1974)
Lt Col Arthur P. Wright (1964–1972)
Maj Oscar L. Williams Jr. (1952–1953)
Col John R. Douglas (1950–1964)

Bases stationed
McGhee Tyson ANGB, Tennessee(16 August 2002 – present)
Alcoa ANGS, Tennessee (1 September 1965 – 16 August 2002)
Otis Air Force Base (18 January 1952 – 1 September 1965)
Knoxville National Guard Armory, Tennessee(6 October 1950 – 18 January 1952)

Decorations
Air Force Outstanding Unit Award 
2 October 2007 – 1 October 2008
1 January 2006 – 1 October 2007
1 January 2000 – 31 December 2001
1 January 1996 – 31 December 1997
1 January 1995 – 31 December 1995
1 January 1990 – 31 December 1991
1 January 1986 – 31 December 1987
1 January 1984 – 31 December 1985
Joint Meritorious Unit Award
1 January 1999 – 3 September 2002
8 April 1991 – 27 October 1991
National Guard Meritorious Service Awards × 2
Air Guard Outstanding Mission Support Squadron Awards × 2

References

External links
 119th Command and Control Squadron Homepage
 Tennessee Air National Guard: 119th CACS

Squadrons of the United States Air National Guard
Military units and formations in Tennessee
Command and Control 0119